Madeline Merlo (born February 9, 1994) is a Canadian country pop singer-songwriter. She signed to Open Road Recordings in 2013 and released her debut album, Free Soul, three years later. In 2015, Merlo received the "Rising Star" award from the Canadian Country Music Association. In 2021, she signed with the Nashville-based BBR Music Group, joining their imprint Wheelhouse Records.

Early life 
Merlo grew up in Maple Ridge, British Columbia. Her father was a funk musician, and the house was often filled with music. She had a desire to be a performer since the first time she sang in front of a crowd of people. In public school, she took part in her school talent show. She sang "Somewhere Over the Rainbow" and after that performance she decided that she wanted to be a singer.

Throughout high school, Merlo played in a band and together they began gigging around. She also continued to hone her vocal skills by performing in musical theatre productions and taking every opportunity she could to further her skills as a performer.

Merlo credits seeing Shania Twain at the first concert she ever attended to be the reason she pursued the genre of country music. Seeing a successful Canadian woman from a small town gave Merlo the confidence to pursue her career.

Career

Music career

2011-2017: Early career and Free Soul
At the age of 17 before she was signed, Merlo wrote songs and recorded music with BC-based writer and producer Dan Swinimer. Swinimer signed her to his production company "Manicdown Productions", and they worked together for nearly two years. In 2012, Swinimer invited RGK Entertainment's Ron Kitchener to Vancouver to see Merlo perform at the Railway Club. Merlo signed with RGK Entertainment and Open Road Recordings as a result in 2013. A year later in February 2014, she released her debut single, "Sinking Like a Stone" which was produced and co-written by Swinimer. It charted for twenty weeks on the Billboard Canada Country chart, peaking at number 32.

She released a self-titled extended play via Open Road Recordings on July 22, 2014. Her single "Honey Jack" became a hit in Canada, landing her the opening slot on The Road Trip Tour alongside Dean Brody and Paul Brandt. In 2015, Merlo won the CCMA Rising Star Award, and the BCCMA Female Artist of the Year. After those big wins, Madeline released a series of singles including "War Paint", "Over and Over", and "Whatcha Wanna Do About It" which entered into the top 10 at Canadian Country Radio. Her debut album Free Soul was released in 2016.

Her single "War Paint" from Free Soul garnered fan support on social media, and was the No. 1 Most Added country song in Canada in its debut week. It was written in response to the loss of one of her friends to mental illness. She dedicated the song to all those who suffer alone, hoping it might bring them hope, and a will to battle and survive. In 2017, "Motel Flamingo" was her 4th song to land in the Top 15 at Canadian Country Radio. Her next single "Neon Love" in 2018 also managed to enter the Top 15 at Canadian country radio making it her 5th single to enter in the Top 15.

2020-present: Songland appearance, BBR Music Group, and Slide EP
On April 13, 2020, Madeline won the first episode of the second season of Songland with her song "Champagne Night" written for Lady Antebellum and produced by Shane McAnally. She then released her seventh and eighth Top 20 singles in Canada, "Kiss Kiss" and "It Didn't".

In 2021, Merlo signed her debut U.S. record deal with BBR Music Group in Nashville. She subsequently released the extended play Slide via their imprint Wheelhouse Records on September 23,  2022. She also provided backing vocals on Cole Swindell's single "She Had Me at Heads Carolina.

Acting career 
In 2017, Merlo starred alongside Jana Kramer and Sophie Tweed-Simmons in the musical film, Country Crush, which saw her play the lead role of a young woman trying to make it as a country singer. She also did the singing voice of Sonata Dusk in My Little Pony: Equestria Girls – Rainbow Rocks.

Personal life
Merlo moved to Nashville, Tennessee, in 2018. She is engaged to Chase Fann, an attorney in Nashville.

Filmography

Discography

Studio albums

Extended plays

Singles

Christmas singles

Music videos

Awards and nominations

References

External links

Canadian women country singers
Living people
Musicians from British Columbia
Open Road Recordings artists
1994 births
Canadian Country Music Association Rising Star Award winners
Canadian country singer-songwriters
21st-century Canadian women singers